Abrorbek Anvarovich Kydyraliev (born 5 April 1992) is an association football midfielder, who plays for FC Kaganat in the Kyrgyzstan League and for the Kyrgyzstan national football team.

International career

Kydyraliyev made his international debut on 13 April 2014 in a 0–0 draw against Afghanistan. He played in his second game, on 14 May 2014, also against  Afghanistan. He appeared in his first win for the team on 23 May 2014 in a 1–0 win over Myanmar in the 2015 AFC Asian Cup qualifying, at the Addu Football Stadium in The Maldives.

References

1992 births
Living people
Kyrgyzstani footballers
Association football midfielders
Kyrgyzstan international footballers
FC Alay players